Packaging Digest is a trade publication and web site owned by Informa. It services the  packaging information needs of manufacturing companies who produce consumer packaged goods and products for other markets, such as healthcare.

The executive editor is Lisa McTigue Pierce, with the editorial offices located in Oak Brook, Illinois, USA.

History
Established in 1963, Packaging Digest is published quarterly, with articles about trends, such as Smart-Secure Packaging, Package Design, and sustainable packaging, as well as new technologies and best practices. As of June 2008, total BPA audited circulation is 90,045 subscribers.

Former owner Reed Business Information sold the magazine to Canon Communications in 2010. UBM plc purchased Canon Communications soon afterward.

External links

Official Website
Food Packaging
Packaging Material

Informa brands
Business magazines published in the United States
Monthly magazines published in the United States
Magazines established in 1963
Magazines published in Illinois
Packaging magazines and journals
Professional and trade magazines